The Fitchburg Trappers are a defunct minor league professional ice hockey team based in Fitchburg, Massachusetts that played in the Atlantic Coast Hockey League (ACHL) during the 1981-82 season. 

They played just six games compiling a record of two wins and four losses under head coach Jean-Guy Gagnon.

References 
Team profile at hockeydb.com

1981 establishments in Massachusetts
1982 disestablishments in Massachusetts
Atlantic Coast Hockey League teams
Sports in Fitchburg, Massachusetts
Ice hockey clubs disestablished in 1982
Ice hockey clubs established in 1981
Ice hockey teams in Massachusetts